Filipe Sauturaga (born 19 June 1994) is a Fijian rugby sevens player.

Sauturaga competed for the Fiji sevens team that won a silver medal at the 2022 Commonwealth Games. He was also a member of the team that won a gold medal at the 2022 Rugby World Cup Sevens in Cape Town.

References 

1994 births
Living people
Male rugby sevens players
Fiji international rugby sevens players
Commonwealth Games medallists in rugby sevens
Commonwealth Games silver medallists for Fiji
Rugby sevens players at the 2022 Commonwealth Games
Medallists at the 2022 Commonwealth Games